Legislative elections were held in on 5 April 2004 for both houses of the People's Consultative Assembly of Indonesia. This included all 550 seats in the People's Representative Council and 128 seats of the newly-formed Regional Representative Council.

Final results of the popular vote tally showed that Golkar, the former ruling party of the New Order era, received the most votes. It had lost to the Indonesian Democratic Party – Struggle in the 1999 legislative election. The Democratic Party and the Prosperous Justice Party, two of the newest parties to participate in the elections, received a combined 14.8% of the popular vote.

Based on the final allocation of seats in the People's Representative Council, Golkar, the Indonesian Democratic Party – Struggle, the National Awakening Party, the United Development Party, the Democratic Party, the Prosperous Justice Party, and the National Mandate Party were qualified to submit candidates for the country's first direct presidential election later in the year.

The election has been described as the most complicated election in the history of democracy.

Background

During its 2002 annual session, the People's Consultative Assembly (MPR) added 14 amendments to the Constitution of Indonesia. Included in these amendments were measures to reorganise the legislature. Beginning in 2004, the MPR was composed of the existing People's Representative Council (DPR) and a new Regional Representative Council (DPD). Because all the seats in the MPR were directly elected, this called for the removal of the military from the legislature, whose 38 seats in the Assembly were appointed. This change and an amendment for direct election of the President and Vice President were significant steps for Indonesia on the road towards full democracy.

On 13 July 2003, President Megawati Sukarnoputri signed into effect a law outlining the composition of the reorganised MPR. The new DPD was composed of four representatives from each of the 32 provinces of Indonesia, not totalling more than one-third of the members of the DPR. The revised constitution also set membership in the DPR at 550.

Electoral campaign
During the first phases of registration, 150 parties were registered with the Ministry of Justice and Human Rights. However, this number was reduced to 50 and then 24 after scrutiny from the newly created General Election Commission. This reduction from the 48 parties that stood in the 1999 legislative election was attributed mainly to a new election law that allowed only parties that had won 2% of seats in the DPR, or 3% of seats in provincial and regental legislatures in half of the provinces to stand in the 2004 election. Only six parties met this requirement, and the remaining parties were required to merge or reorganise into a new party.

The campaign period for parties and candidates began on 11 March and continued until 1 April. It was split into two phases by Nyepi, the Balinese day of silence. Parties delivered their national agendas indoors between 11 and 25 March. Although this was meant to encourage dialogue between parties and their constituents, these events were poorly attended. The International Foundation for Electoral Systems conducted a tracking survey that showed not all voters knew how to vote for candidates of the new DPD, or were even aware it existed.

Up to 475,000 candidates were nominated by the political parties in the national, provincial, and regental levels. More than 1,200 candidates stood for 128 seats in the DPD, and 7,756 candidates stood for 550 seats in the DPR. Candidates were elected in an open list system.

Conduct
Election day, 5 April, was relatively free of major incidents and irregularities. Minor violations included officials helping elderly voters cast and submit ballots. Two Indonesian election officials were also reported killed when delivering voting equipment in Papua. The Australian Parliamentary Observer Delegation and the European Union Election Observer Mission were among the organisations observing the election.

Results
The election results determined which political parties were eligible to submit candidates for Indonesia's first direct presidential election, which was held on 5 July. Only parties that received 5% of the popular vote or 3% of seats in the People's Representative Council could submit candidates. Parties that did not meet these criteria had to join with other parties to meet at least one criterion.

The counting of votes took one month, and the final results were announced on 5 May, one week later than was initially scheduled. Of 148,000,369 registered voters, 124,420,339 ballots (84.06%) were submitted. Of these ballots, 113,462,414 were considered valid, and 10,957,925 were declared invalid. In the People's Representative Council, the Party of the Functional Groups (Golkar) received the most number of seats. It had previously lost to the Indonesian Democratic Party – Struggle in the 1999 legislative election after being in power since 1970. However, fourteen of the twenty-four participating parties refused to certify the election results after allegations of irregular vote counting.

By province

Seat allocation
To achieve proportional representation, seat allocation was conducted using the largest remainder method, whereby the Hare quota was used to determine seats automatically secured by individual parties. Any remaining seats assigned to the electoral region were allocated to remaining political parties based on the rank order of their remaining votes.

A total of 273 disputes were brought before the Constitutional Court, the last of which were decided on 21 June. Of these cases, 38 decisions affected the final allocation of seats in the People's Representative Council and provincial and regental legislatures. The Democratic Party lost two seats, one to the National Mandate Party and Prosperous Peace Party each. The Pioneers' Party gained one seat from the United Democratic Nationhood Party. Meanwhile, the only seat allocated to the Freedom Bull National Party by the General Election Commission was reassigned to the Reform Star Party.

After the resolution of all disputes, sixteen parties received at least one seat in the People's Representative Council, while eight received none. The inconsistency in the order of parties according to votes received and seats allocated arose due to a special rule created to address uneven population distribution between Java and other islands. This rule stipulates that the Hare quota values for the provinces in Java were on average higher than those for the outer islands. A party require fewer votes to automatically secure a seat outside of Java. For example, the National Awakening Party (PKB) received more votes than the National Mandate Party (PAN) but received nearly the same number of seats. More than half of PKB seats were received in the party's stronghold of East Java, where the quota value was higher. In contrast, only four of PAN seats were automatically secured.

Analysis

Results showed that Golkar, the former ruling party of the New Order era led by People's Representative Council Speaker Akbar Tanjung, had won the most number of seats, defeating President Megawati Sukarnoputri's Indonesian Democratic Party – Struggle (PDI–P). Golkar received more votes than other parties in twenty-six out of thirty-two provinces. However, these results occurred because of declining PDI–P popularity rather than an increase in Golkar's popularity. Golkar's support in its traditional stronghold of Sulawesi declined due to the performance of medium and small parties in the region. Despite winning the largest share of vote once again in Bali, PDI–P performance there suffered the greatest after the 2002 bombings by terrorist group Jemaah Islamiyah devastated the island province's economy.

Both the National Awakening Party (PKB) and the United Development Party (PPP), both of whom were considered Islamist parties, maintained their rankings in the People's Representative Council. The PKB, co-founded by former President and former Nahdlatul Ulama Chairman Abdurrahman Wahid, continued to perform well in its stronghold of East Java despite losing votes.

The Islamic Prosperous Justice Party (PKS) and the Democratic Party (PD) finished first and second, respectively, in Jakarta, where voting patterns were considered a "barometer of Indonesian politics". Together, both parties received 42.5% of votes in the capital city.

Polarisation of voting patterns based on religion was evident in the eastern provinces. Christianity-based Prosperous Peace Party (PDS) received 14.8% of votes in Christian-dominant North Sulawesi and 13 seats overall in the People's Representative Council. Likewise, Muslims were more likely to vote for the PKS in regions where religious conflict has been historically prevalent.

Aftermath
The 2004 legislative election was the most complicated in Indonesian history because Indonesians had to vote for representatives at the national, provincial, and regental levels. These factors made Indonesia's electoral system unique from other systems in the world. The election was described as the longest and most complicated election in the history of democracy and secured the nation's place as the world's third-largest democracy. Even before the election, the seat allocation system for the People's Representative Council was also deemed "the most complicated in the world" by several news sources across the country.

Seven political parties met the criteria to submit candidates for the July presidential election: Golkar, the Indonesian Democratic Party – Struggle (PDI–P), the National Awakening Party (PKB), the United Development Party (PPP), the Democratic Party (PD), the Prosperous Justice Party (PKS), and the National Mandate Party (PAN). The PKS was the only party not to nominate candidates, but it threw its support behind PAN's Amien Rais.

Newly elected members of the People's Representative Council (DPR) and the Regional Representative Council (DPD) took the oath of office in separate sessions on 1 October, one day later than was scheduled. Both houses then convened together in the early morning of 2 October and took the oath of office as the People's Consultative Assembly (MPR). Ginandjar Kartasasmita was elected the inaugural chairman of the DPD with 72 of 128 votes in a run-off against Irman Gusman on 1 October. The following day, Agung Laksono of Golkar was elected Speaker of the DPR by a vote of 280 to 257. The Chairman of the MPR was not elected until several days later when Hidayat Nur Wahid of the PKS won the vote 326 to 324 against PDI–P's Sutjipto.

On 5 October, three regencies were carved out of the province of South Sulawesi to form West Sulawesi as the 33rd province of Indonesia. Because this occurred after the elections, West Sulawesi was not represented in the Regional Representative Council until the 2009 legislative election.

References

Notes

External links
 General Election Commission 
 EconPapers: The Political Robustness in Indonesia
 Psephos – Adam Carr's Election Archive: Republic of Indonesia 2004 legislative election

Indonesia
2004 elections in Indonesia
Legislative elections in Indonesia
2004 election